During the Second Anglo-Boer War which lasted from 1899–1902, the British operated concentration camps in South Africa: the term "concentration camp" grew in prominence during that period. The camps had originally been set up by the British Army as refugee camps in order to provide refuge for civilian families who had been forced to abandon their homes for any reason which was related to the war. However, when General The 1st Baron Kitchener of Khartoum, as he then was, took command of the British forces in late 1900, he introduced new tactics in an attempt to break the guerrilla campaign and the influx of civilians grew dramatically as a result. An epidemic of measles killed thousands. According to historian Thomas Pakenham, Lord Kitchener initiated plans to flush out guerrillas in a series of systematic drives, organised like a sporting shoot, with success defined by a weekly 'bag' of killed, captured and wounded, and sweep the country bare of everything that could give sustenance to the guerrillas, including women and children. It was the clearance of civilians - uprooting a nation- that came to dominate the last phases of the war.

As Boer farms were destroyed by the British under their "Scorched Earth" policy—including the systematic destruction of crops and the slaughtering or removal of livestock, the burning down of homesteads and farms—to prevent the Boers from resupplying themselves from a home base, many tens of thousands of men, women and children were forcibly moved into the camps. This was not the first appearance of internment camps, as the Spanish had used internment in Cuba in the Ten Years' War, but the Boer War concentration camp system was the first time that a whole nation had been systematically targeted, and the first in which some whole regions had been depopulated. 

Eventually, there were a total of 45 tented camps which were built for Boer internees and 64 additional camps which were built for black Africans. Of the 28,000 Boer men who were captured as prisoners of war, 25,630 were sent overseas. The vast majority of Boers who remained in the local camps were women and children. Over 26,000 women and children perished in these concentration camps.

The camps were poorly administered from the outset and they became increasingly overcrowded when Lord Kitchener's troops implemented the internment strategy on a vast scale. Conditions were terrible for the health of the internees, mainly due to neglect, poor hygiene and bad sanitation. The supply of all items was unreliable, partly because of the constant disruption of communication lines by the Boers. The food rations were meagre and there was a two-tier allocation policy, whereby families of men who were still fighting were routinely given smaller rations than others. The inadequate shelter, poor diet, bad hygiene and overcrowding led to malnutrition and endemic contagious diseases such as measles, typhoid and dysentery to which the children were particularly vulnerable. Coupled with a shortage of modern medical facilities, many of the internees died.

UK public opinion and political opposition

Although the 1900 UK general election, also known as the "Khaki election", had resulted in a victory for the Conservative government on the back of recent British victories against the Boers, public support quickly waned as it became apparent that the war would not be easy and further unease developed following reports filtering back to Britain concerning the treatment of Boer civilians by the British. Public and political opposition to government policies in South Africa regarding Boer civilians was first expressed in Parliament in February 1901 in the form of an attack on the government by the Liberal Party MP David Lloyd George.

Emily Hobhouse, a delegate of the South African Women and Children's Distress Fund, visited some of the camps in the Orange Free State from January 1901, and in May 1901 she returned to England on board the ship, the Saxon. Alfred Milner, High Commissioner in South Africa, also boarded the Saxon for holiday in England but, unfortunately for both the camp internees and the British government, he had no time for Miss Hobhouse, regarding her as a Boer sympathiser and "trouble maker". On her return, Emily Hobhouse did much to publicise the distress of the camp inmates. She managed to speak to the Liberal Party leader, Henry Campbell-Bannerman who professed to be suitably outraged but was disinclined to press the matter, as his party was split between the imperialists and the pro-Boer factions.

The more radical Liberals however such as David Lloyd George and John Ellis were prepared to raise the matter in Parliament and to harass the government on the issue, which they duly did. St John Brodrick, the Conservative secretary of state for war, first defended the government's policy by arguing that the camps were purely "voluntary" and that the interned Boers were "contented and comfortable", but was somewhat undermined as he had no firm statistics to back up his argument, so when his "voluntary" argument proved untenable, he resorted to the "military necessity" argument and stated that everything possible was being done to ensure satisfactory conditions in the camps.

Hobhouse published a report in June 1901 that contradicted Brodrick's claim, and Lloyd George then openly accused the government of "a policy of extermination" directed against the Boer population. The same month Liberal opposition party leader Campbell-Bannerman took up the assault and answered the rhetorical question "When is a war not a war?" with his own rhetorical answer "When it is carried on by methods of barbarism in South Africa", referring to those same camps and the policies that created them. The Hobhouse report caused uproar both domestically and among the international community. However, there was very little public sympathy outside South Africa for the highly reactionary Boer president Paul Kruger.

The Fawcett Commission

Although the government had comfortably won the parliamentary debate by a margin of 252 to 149, it was stung by the criticism. Concerned by the escalating public outcry, it called on Kitchener for a detailed report. In response, complete statistical returns from camps were sent out in July 1901. By August 1901, it was clear to government and opposition alike that Miss Hobhouse's worst fears were being confirmed – 93,940 Boers and 24,457 black Africans were reported to be in "camps of refuge" and the crisis was becoming a catastrophe as the death rates appeared very high, especially among the children.

The government responded to the growing clamour by appointing a commission. The Fawcett Commission, as it became known was, uniquely for its time, an all-woman affair headed by Millicent Fawcett who despite being the leader of the women's suffrage movement was a Liberal Unionist and thus a government supporter and considered a safe pair of hands. Between August and December 1901, the Fawcett Commission conducted its own tour of the camps in South Africa. While it is probable that the British government expected the Commission to produce a report that could be used to fend off criticism, in the end it confirmed everything that Emily Hobhouse had said. Indeed, if anything the Commission's recommendations went even further. The Commission insisted that rations should be increased and that additional nurses be sent out immediately, and included a long list of other practical measures designed to improve conditions in the camp. Millicent Fawcett was quite blunt in expressing her opinion that much of the catastrophe was owed to a simple failure to observe elementary rules of hygiene.

In November 1901, the Colonial Secretary Joseph Chamberlain ordered Alfred Milner to ensure that "all possible steps are being taken to reduce the rate of mortality". The civil authority took over the running of the camps from Kitchener and the British command and by February 1902 the annual death-rate in the concentration camps for white inmates dropped to 6.9 percent and eventually to 2 percent. However, by then the damage had been done. A report after the war concluded that 27,927 Boers (of whom 24,074 [50 percent of the Boer child population] were children under 16) had died in the camps. In all, about one in four (25 percent) of the Boer inmates, mostly children, died.

"Improvements [however] were much slower in coming to the black camps". It is thought that about 12 percent of black African inmates died (about 14,154) but the precise number of deaths of black Africans in concentration camps is unknown as little attempt was made to keep any records of the 107,000 black Africans who were interned.

Sir Arthur Conan Doyle had served as a volunteer doctor in the Langman Field Hospital at Bloemfontein between March and June 1900. In his widely distributed and translated pamphlet 'The War in South Africa: Its Cause and Conduct' he justified both the reasonings behind the war and handling of the conflict itself. He also pointed out that over 14,000 British soldiers had died of disease during the conflict (as opposed to 8,000 killed in combat) and at the height of epidemics he was seeing 50–60 British soldiers dying each day in a single ill-equipped and overwhelmed military hospital.

Kitchener's policy and the post-war debate

It has been argued that "this was not a deliberately genocidal policy; rather it was the result of [a] disastrous lack of foresight and rank incompetence on [the] part of the [British] military". Scottish historian Niall Ferguson has also argued that "Kitchener no more desired the deaths of women and children in the camps than of the wounded Dervishes after Omdurman, or of his own soldiers in the typhoid stricken hospitals of Bloemfontein."

However, to Lord Kitchener and British High Command "the life or death of the 154,000 Boer and African civilians in the camps rated as an abysmally low priority" against military objectives. As the Fawcett Commission was delivering its recommendations, Kitchener wrote to St John Brodrick defending his policy of sweeps, and emphasising that no new Boer families were being brought in unless they were in danger of facing starvation. This was disingenuous as the countryside had by then been devastated under the "Scorched Earth" policy (the Fawcett Commission in December 1901 in its recommendations commented that: "to turn 100,000 people now being held in the concentration camps out on the veldt to take care of themselves would be cruelty") and now that the New Model counter insurgency tactics were in full swing, it made little sense to leave the Boer families by themselves in desperate conditions in the countryside.

It was according to one historian that "at [the Vereeniging negotiations in May 1902] Boer leader Louis Botha asserted that he had tried to send [Boer] families to the British, but they had refused to receive them." Quoting a Boer commandant referring to Boer women and children made refugees by Britain's scorched-earth policy as saying, "Our families are in a pitiable condition and the enemy uses those families to force us to surrender ...and there is little doubt that that was indeed the intention of Kitchener when he had issued instructions that no more families were to be brought into the concentration camps." Thomas Pakenham writes of Kitchener's policy U-turn,

Notes

References
 
 excerpt and text search; a standard scholarly history
 
 
 

 
1900 establishments in South Africa
1902 disestablishments in South Africa
Buildings and structures completed in 1900
Buildings and structures demolished in 1902
Military history of the United Kingdom
Second Boer War
Internments
Total institutions